Victor Mauro Willard (1813December 10, 1869) was an American farmer and Wisconsin pioneer.  He served as a delegate to Wisconsin's first constitutional convention and was a member of the Wisconsin State Senate in 1849 and 1850, representing Racine County.

Biography
Born in New York, Willard moved to the town of Waterford in the Wisconsin Territory in 1837.  He was elected as a delegate of Racine County to Wisconsin's first constitutional convention in 1846.  At the convention, he worked on the committee to draft an act of congress which would ratify the admission of the state.  However, the constitution created by the 1st convention was ultimately rejected by the voters of Wisconsin.

In 1848, Willard was elected to the Wisconsin State Senate on the Free Soil Party ticket for the 1849 and 1850 sessions.  He represented the 17th State Senate district which at that time comprised the territory making up present-day Racine County—in 1849, this was only the northern half of Racine County.  Kenosha County was created from the southern half of Racine County in 1850.

Willard died of tuberculosis on December 10, 1869.

References 

1813 births
1869 deaths
Farmers from Wisconsin
Wisconsin state senators
People from Waterford, Wisconsin
Wisconsin Free Soilers
19th-century American politicians